The C.S.P.S. Hall in Cedar Rapids, Iowa, USA was built during 1890-91 and expanded twice in the next two decades.  It was a social and cultural center of the local Czech-Slovak Protective Society (C.S.P.S.).  The building was individually listed on the National Register of Historic Places in 1978.  In 2002 it was included as a contributing property in the Bohemian Commercial Historic District.

The C.S.P.S. was an organization that began with offering a kind of insurance to members.  The first lodge of the C.S.P.S. in Cedar Rapids was founded in 1879 and there were three by 1882.

The building is a local adaptation of Richardsonian Romanesque architecture.

The building was damaged in the 2008 flooding of Cedar Rapids, but underwent a major renovation in 2011 that preserved its historic character.  The building has since 1992 been used by Legion Arts, a nonprofit organization that offers visual art displays, theatre, and concerts.

See also
Czecho Slovakian Association Hall (Iowa City, Iowa), also NRHP-listed, built in 1900

References

Cultural infrastructure completed in 1891
Czech-Slovak Protective Society
Czech-American culture in Iowa
Buildings and structures in Cedar Rapids, Iowa
National Register of Historic Places in Cedar Rapids, Iowa
Clubhouses on the National Register of Historic Places in Iowa
Richardsonian Romanesque architecture in Iowa
1891 establishments in Iowa
Individually listed contributing properties to historic districts on the National Register in Iowa